Tin Cup Chalice (April 3, 2005 – April 17, 2009), was an American Thoroughbred racehorse who, in 2008, became the first New York-bred to win New York’s “OTB Big Apple Triple" of Racing: the Mike Lee Stakes, the New York Derby, and the Albany Stakes.

Pedigree
Tin Cup Chalice was by the Grade I winner Crusader Sword (whose own sire is the great Damascus by Sword Dancer.  Crusader Sword was the only son of Damascus when he stood in the Northeast.  Tin Cup Chalice’s dam is Twice Forbidden, out of the first New York crop of Spectacular Bid who had been relocated from Claiborne Farm to Milfer Farm, Unadilla, NY in 1992.  Twice Forbidden also produced stakes winners Mr. Fantasy and Don Corleone.  Both Damascus and “The Bid” were Horses of the Year.  All in all, Tin Cup Chalice, offered for $2,000 at the New York Breeders’ Sales Company 2005 October mixed sale, came from a formidable family.

Named for a Jimmy Buffett song (although in the tradition of working out Thoroughbred names from their sire and dam’s names, Crusader Sword and Twice Forbidden seems a subtle way to achieve Tin Cup Chalice), Tin Cup Chalice was a black-pointed Bay making his home base at Finger Lakes race track (where America’s great loser Zippy Chippy might or might not be a stable pony).

The colt nearly died twice before he was a year old, once from a case of botulism and once from a bout with horse colic.  He was also from the same female family as Silky Sullivan, the “come-from-the-clouds” California fan favorite back in 1957 and 1958, and after Silky, is probably the most talented.  Despite his pedigree, he failed to attract a bid at the 2006 New York Breeders Sale at Saratoga possibly because his sire had yet produced anything notable since the multiple graded stakes winner Isitingood in 1991, or possibly because Tin Cup Chalice was small and narrow and had come too near death too often to inspire confidence.

Racing accomplishments
To take the Albany and with it the Triple Crown of New York-breds, Tin Cup Chalice had to step up in class.  Before the race he'd faced only New York-breds, or lesser-quality stakes horses, in his short career.  In the Albany, he went up against top national competition.  His co-owner, breeder and trainer, Lecesse of Farmington, New York, said, “I know one thing.  I wouldn’t bet against a horse that’s undefeated.” In the Albany Stakes, ridden by regular jockey Pedro Rodriguez, he defeated Icabad Crane and Big Truck, both New York-breds and both recently off the United States Triple Crown of Thoroughbred Racing trail.

In his first start outside New York and in graded stakes company, Tin Cup Chalice won the Indiana Derby.  Against the likes of the deep closer Pyro (who came up fast to place), he clicked off splits of :23.20, :48.20 and 1:13.40.  In his only defeat, he placed in the Step Nicely Stakes at Belmont Park.

Japan Cup Dirt

In late October 2008, the trainer and co-owner Mike LeCesse was contacted by Japanese racing officials about his horse racing in the Japan Cup Dirt (JPN-G1) with all expenses paid for Tin Cup Chalice to compete.  The race, worth $USD 2.4 million, takes place on December 7 at Hanshin Racecourse. The Japan Cup Dirt is run clockwise around the oval (as many English races are run, and as American races once were run before the American Revolutionary War) so Tin Cup Chalice was tested, as a requirement of the Japan Racing Club, to determine his ability to adapt to running against his usual direction.  That workout, held November 5, was successful and he was shipped to Japan...arriving after a 24-hour flight from Rochester, New York on November 20, 2008.

At the Hanshin Racecourse on December 1, 2008 Tin Cup Chalice worked at 5 furlongs in 59.10 seconds. While Pedro Rodriguez has been the regular rider for Tin Cup Chalice, and was to travel to Japan, he encountered Visa/Passport issues and was not successful in obtaining a permit.  Accordingly Edgar Prado, already in Japan for the World Super Jockey Series, picked up the mount and worked with the New York-bred in the days prior to the Japan Cup Dirt. Tin Cup Chalice took the lead for the first half of the Japan Cup Dirt, but gave way shortly after that. He came in 13th out of 16 horses in the Japan Cup Dirt race. He went off at odds of 9-to-1 making him the fourth-most-favored out of the 16.

Death

On April 17, 2009, while in training at Finger Lakes Gaming and Race Track, Tin Cup Chalice suffered a spinal injury in the head-on collision with a runaway colt named Zany, a 4 year old son of War Chant at about 6:20 am EST. Despite more than 90 minutes of care and treatment on the track, the decision was made to euthanize Tin Cup Chalice when it became apparent to veterinarian Brendan Warrell that the injuries were catastrophic. Zany suffered crippling injuries and was euthanized not long after Warrell arrived at the scene.

Tin Cup Chalice's jockey, Pedro Rodriguez was treated and released from the hospital. Zany's exercise rider, Jeannie Cook, was not injured.

Tin Cup Chalice had been entered to race that opening day for Finger Lakes but because of the small field - just five - it did not fill and the race did not go off. The plan then was to run him in a stakes race at Mountaineer Park May 10. Co-owner Mike Lecesse was quoted as saying: "If he would have been in [the race] today, he wouldn't have been on the track this morning.  It's nobody's fault."

Tin Cup Chalice was transported to Cornell University's equine hospital for a necropsy, part of insurance requirements. His ashes will be buried in the track's infield, not far from the finish line near the grave of the track's first big star, Fio Rito.  Fio Rito was owned by LeCesse's father, Raymond.

References

 Tin Cup Chalice’s pedigree, stats, and photo
 Bloodhorse article on Tin Cup Chalice.
 Rochester (NY) Democrat and Chronicle Nov 6, 2008 "Finger Lakes star Tin Cup Chalice to race in Japan"

2005 racehorse births
2009 racehorse deaths
Racehorses trained in the United States
Racehorses bred in New York (state)
Thoroughbred family 4-m